Sonja McCaskie (19 February 1939 – 5 April 1963) was a British alpine skier who participated in the 1960 Winter Olympics. McCaskie lived in Reno, Nevada, with her son and worked at a nearby ski resort as an instructor prior to her death in 1963.

Murder
A neighbor who was babysitting initially called the police to check on McCaskie after she failed to pick up her son. Police found McCaskie strangled, raped, and dismembered in her 2640 Yori Avenue apartment Friday 5 April 1963. She had been murdered by Thomas Lee Bean, an 18-year-old high school student who attended nearby Wooster High School. Bean was sentenced to death in the Nevada gas chamber for the murder, but was taken off death row in 1970. He remains incarcerated in Northern Nevada Correctional Center and is the longest-serving inmate in the Nevada Department of Corrections.

The murder was sensationalized in the September 1963 issue (25-31 August early sports edition) of the National Enquirer with the frontpage headline (and a grisly photo) as: "I CUT OUT HER HEART & STOMPED ON IT".

References

External links
 British Olympic Association profile of Sonja McCaskie

1939 births
1963 deaths
Scottish female alpine skiers
Alpine skiers at the 1960 Winter Olympics
Scottish expatriates in the United States
British people murdered abroad
Olympic alpine skiers of Great Britain
Scottish murder victims
People murdered in Nevada